"Stay Out Of My Life" is a 1987 hit single by British pop group Five Star. It was the fifth release from their number one selling LP Silk & Steel, and reached no.9 in the UK singles chart.

The song's B-side, "How Dare You (Stay Out Of My Life)", was used as the theme tune to the 1980s children's television series made by Tyne Tees TV called How Dare You, presented by Carrie Grant.

Track listings
7” Single:

1. "Stay Out Of My Life"

2. "(How Dare You) Stay Out Of My Life" 

12” Single:

1. "Stay Out Of My Life" (Extended Version)

2. "If I Say Yes" (Lew Hahn U.S. Dub Remix)

3. "(How Dare You) Stay Out Of My Life"  

All tracks available on the remastered versions of either the 2010 'Silk & Steel' album, the 2013 'The Remix Anthology (The Remixes 1984-1991)' or the 2018 'Luxury - The Definitive Anthology 1984-1991' boxset.

References

Five Star songs
1987 singles
Songs written by Denise Pearson